Robert Michael Morris (May 6, 1940 – May 30, 2017) was an American actor. He was known for his co-starring role as Mickey Deane in the reality television spoof The Comeback and as Mr. Lunt in the short-lived series Running Wilde. He also wrote over 100 plays.

Biography
Born in Kentucky, Morris obtained a Bachelor of Arts in English and art from the University of Dayton, as well as a Master of Fine Arts in playwriting from the Catholic University of America. He taught both high school and college theater before becoming a professional actor relatively late in life and relocating to New York City. "I moved to New York so I could find out what it was like to be a professional actor because my students were all asking questions and all I had was academic knowledge. I didn't have any real professional knowledge." Michael Patrick King, one of Morris's students, and Lisa Kudrow wrote his role in The Comeback with him in mind; King asked him to audition.

Morris also had notable guest appearances in such series as Will & Grace, How I Met Your Mother, Better Things and 2 Broke Girls.

Morris died on May 30, 2017, at age 77.

References

External links
 

1940 births
2017 deaths
American male television actors
Drama teachers
University of Dayton alumni
Catholic University of America alumni
21st-century American male actors
Male actors from Kentucky
American male dramatists and playwrights
20th-century American dramatists and playwrights
21st-century American dramatists and playwrights
20th-century American male writers
21st-century American male writers